The Lambeth Walk is a 1939 British musical comedy film directed by Albert de Courville and starring Lupino Lane, Sally Gray and Seymour Hicks. It was an adaptation of the 1937 musical Me and My Girl, and was released under that title in the U.S. The film takes its British title from the play's best known song, "The Lambeth Walk". The star of the musical, Lupino Lane, reprised his lead role in the film.

Synopsis
Bill Snibson, a chancer from Lambeth Walk in South London, is informed that he has been discovered to be the long-lost heir to a title and castle which he can claim provided he is able to convince his new relations that he has enough aristocratic bearing. Things soon begin to go awry however, particularly when Sally, Bill's girlfriend from Lambeth, turns up.

Cast
 Lupino Lane - Bill Snibson 
 Sally Gray - Sally Smith
 Sir Seymour Hicks - Sir John 
 Norah Howard - The Duchess 
 Enid Stamp-Taylor - Jacqueline 
 Wallace Lupino - Parchester 
 Wilfrid Hyde-White - Lord Battersby 
 May Hallatt - Lady Battersby 
 Charles Heslop - Oswald

References

External links

1939 films
1939 musical comedy films
British musical comedy films
Films about inheritances
Films directed by Albert de Courville
Films based on musicals
Films shot at Pinewood Studios
Films produced by Anthony Havelock-Allan
Films set in London
Films scored by Jack Beaver
British black-and-white films
Films with screenplays by John Paddy Carstairs
1930s English-language films
1930s British films